The 2006 Arizona State Sun Devils football team represented Arizona State University in the 2006 NCAA Division I FBS football season. The team's coach was Dirk Koetter who was fired after the season. It played its home games at Sun Devil Stadium in Tempe, Arizona.

Schedule

Rankings

Personnel

Game summaries

Northern Arizona

Rudy Carpenter threw for 261 yards and 2 touchdowns and an interception as The Sun Devils needed a strong fourth quarter to beat I-AA Northern Arizona at home.

Nevada

ASU had 575 total yards, as Rudy Carpenter threw for 333 yards and 5 touchdowns (to 5 different receivers) and an interception and the Sun Devils rolled over the Wolf Pack.  RB Ryan Torain led ASU with 70 yards and a touchdown on 8 carries.

Colorado

ASU had 440 total yards, as Rudy Carpenter threw for 248 yards, 2 touchdowns, and 2 interceptions and the Sun Devils defeated the Buffaloes.  ASU RBs Keegan Herring and Ryan Torain combined for 162 yards and 1 touchdown on 27 carries.  The ASU defense held Colorado QB Bernard Jackson to 86 passing yards.

California

Ryan Torain rushed for 185 yards and 1 touchdown, but Rudy Carpenter threw 4 INTs as the Sun Devils struggled all afternoon against the Golden Bears.  The ASU defense, who had only given up 38 points all year, gave up 396 yards on defense.

Oregon

Ryan Torain rushed for 113 yards, but Rudy Carpenter completed only 6 passes for 33 yards as the Sun Devils never led against the Ducks.  The Sun Devil offense only went 1-13 on 3rd down conversions, and could only muster 213 total yards.  The ASU defense coughed up 584 yards, a season high.

USC

The ASU defense caused 4 USC turnovers, but they could only manage 266 total yards as the Sun Devils lost a close one to USC, 28-21.  Rudy Carpenter went 12-21 with 124 yards.  Ryan Torain collected 96 total yards and a touchdown.

Stanford

    
    
    
    
    
    
    

Homecoming weekend proved to be nice to the Devils, who punished a struggling Stanford squad, 38-3.  Rudy Carpenter went 14-15 with 160 yards and a touchdown.  Keegan Herring rushed for 2 touchdowns.  The Cardinal offense was held to only 190 yards.

Washington

Homecoming weekend in Seattle was ruined by a walk-off Carpenter to Brent Miller touchdown pass in Overtime.

Oregon State

Washington State

UCLA

Arizona

Hawaii Bowl

Previous meeting: Hawaii 29, Arizona State 17 (1979)

Colt Brennan broke the NCAA single-season record for touchdown passes with 58, throwing five in the second half to lead Hawaii to a 41-24 victory over Arizona State in the Hawaii Bowl.

Brennan, 33-of-42 for 559 yards, threw a 7-yard scoring pass to Ryan Grice-Mullen on the Warriors' second series of the second half to break the previous mark of 54 set by Houston's David Klingler in 1990, also against the Sun Devils.

Brennan tied the record with his 54th touchdown pass on the previous series, throwing a 38-yard scoring pass to Jason Rivers.

Brennan and Rivers, selected the co-MVPs for Hawaii, also teamed on the final touchdown pass, a 79-yarder late in the fourth quarter. Rivers finished the game with 308 yards on 14 catches, the most in a college bowl game since 1937, which is as far as the record books go back.

Brennan also set the WAC single-season record for most passing yards (5,549), which was previously held by BYU's Ty Detmer in 1990.

The Warrior offense racked up a season high 680 total yards, while the defense held Arizona State to 391 yards, sacked Sun Devil quarterback Rudy Carpenter four times, and forced two fumbles, one in the red zone halting an ASU drive, and another which led to a field goal.

Brennan finished the season with 5,549 yards to become just the third quarterback in college history with 5,000 yards and 50 touchdowns in a season, joining Klingler and Texas Tech's B. J. Symons.

Hawaii (11-3) matched the school mark for most wins in a season, set in 1992 when the team went 11-2. The Sun Devils (7-6) concluded their disappointing season, unable to send coach Dirk Koetter out with a win. He coached his final game after being fired the previous month. Dennis Erickson has been hired to take over the team.

Game MVPs: Jason Rivers, WR & Colt Brennan, QB: Hawaii. Ryan Torain, RB: Arizona State

References

Arizona State
Arizona State Sun Devils football seasons
Arizona State Sun Devils football